Ian Palmer may refer to:

 Ian Palmer (bishop) (born 1950), former Anglican Bishop of Bathurst
 Ian Palmer (footballer) (1921–2005), Australian rules footballer
 Ian Palmer (golfer) (born 1957), South African golfer
 Ian Palmer (sailor) (born 1941), Australian Olympic sailor
 Ian Palmer (soccer) (1966–2021), South African football coach
 Ian Palmer (South African footballer), active in the 1950s
 Ian Palmer, musician from the group Hexedene